St Mary's Church, Castlegate, York is a Grade I listed former parish church in the Church of England in York.

History
The church is located in Castlegate, an historical street in the centre of York. It dates from the 11th century, but the current building is mostly 15th century.

Highwayman John Nevison, who was hanged on the Knavesmire, in March 1684 was buried in an unmarked grave in the churchyard.

The church was restored between 1867 and 1870 when the east window was replaced, the church re-roofed and the east end parapet was renewed by William Butterfield.

Organ
Details of the installation of the original organ are not known, but it was repaired at a cost of £45 by Hopkins of Heworth in 1884. A new organ was obtained in 1892 by Abbott & Co. A specification of the organ can be found on the National Pipe Organ Register. When the church was declared redundant, the organ was moved to St Thomas’ Church, Heigham, Norfolk.

Exhibition space
The church was declared redundant in 1958 and converted by George Pace and Ronald Sims for secular use. It now houses contemporary art exhibitions operated by York Museums Trust. It has hosted exhibitions by Susan Stockwell, Susan Aldworth, and the Aesthetica Art Prize.

In 2016 there were 6,906 visitors to exhibitions in the church.

References

Former Church of England church buildings
Mary, Catlegate
Church of England church buildings in York
York Museums Trust